Sceloporus teapensis, the  Teapen rosebelly lizard, is a species of lizard in the family Phrynosomatidae. It is found in Mexico, Guatemala, and Belize.

References

Sceloporus
Reptiles of Mexico
Reptiles of Guatemala
Reptiles of Belize
Reptiles described in 1890
Taxa named by Albert Günther